Gerardus Johannes "Peer" Krom (10 March 1898 – 15 December 1965) was a Dutch footballer. He competed in the men's tournament at the 1924 Summer Olympics.

At club level, Krom spent his career with RCH, where he won the national championship in the 1922–23 season.

Honours
RCH
 Netherlands Football League Championship: 1922–23

References

External links

1898 births
1965 deaths
Dutch footballers
Netherlands international footballers
Olympic footballers of the Netherlands
Footballers at the 1924 Summer Olympics
Footballers from Haarlem
Association football midfielders
Racing Club Heemstede players